Jules Denis Onana (born 12 June 1964 in Yaoundé) is a retired Cameroonian football player. He is the brother of Elie Onana. He played for the club Canon Yaounde, and also took part in the 1990 FIFA World Cup, playing 3 of the 5 matches of the Cameroon national football team. He decided to retire in 2005 after he played in several clubs in Cameroon, France and Indonesia with Pelita Jaya. After  retirement, he served as the player agent in Asian countries. He had 56 caps for Cameroon national football team.

Honour

Canon Yaounde
Cameroonian Championship: 1 (1991)
Cameroonian Cup: 1 (1993)

References

External links

1964 births
Living people
Footballers from Yaoundé
Cameroonian footballers
Cameroonian expatriate footballers
Cameroon international footballers
1990 FIFA World Cup players
1990 African Cup of Nations players
1992 African Cup of Nations players
Canon Yaoundé players
Pelita Bandung Raya players
Expatriate footballers in Indonesia
Cameroonian expatriate sportspeople in Indonesia
Association football defenders